Elements is an American jazz fusion ensemble founded by bass guitarist Mark Egan and drummer Danny Gottlieb in 1982. Both Egan and Gottlieb were members of the Pat Metheny Group, and Elements's sound draws from their experience. Band members include Bill Evans, Gil Goldstein, Steve Khan and Clifford Carter. Elements last appeared to be active in the mid 90s. Gottlieb and Egan continue to record music together (featuring a more traditional jazz stlye) using their own names rather than the Elements moniker as of 2019.

Discography 
 1982 Elements (Philo)
 1984 Forward Motion (Antilles)
 1985 Blown Away (Mesa/Bluemoon)
 1987 Illumination (Novus)
 1989 Liberal Arts (Novus)
 1990 Spirit River (Novus)
 1992 Far East, Vol. 1 (Wavetone)
 1995 Far East, Vol. 2 (Wavetone)
 1996 Untold Stories (Wavetone)

References
 

American jazz ensembles
Jazz fusion ensembles
Post-bop ensembles
Smooth jazz ensembles
Antilles Records artists